Tousignant may refer to:

Chloe Tousignant, a fictional character in Zoo (TV series)
Élise Paré-Tousignant (1937–2018), Canadian music administrator and pedagogue
Claude Tousignant (b. 1932),  Canadian artist 
Guy Tousignant (b. 1941),  Canadian soldier
Henri Tousignant (b. 1937), Canadian politician
Luc Tousignant (b. 1958), Canadian football player
Mathieu Tousignant (b. 1989), Canadian ice hockey player